Rocky Mountain oysters or mountain oysters, or meat balls, also known as prairie oysters in Canada, is a dish made of bull testicles. The organs are often deep-fried after being skinned, coated in flour, pepper and salt, and sometimes pounded flat. The dish is most often served as an appetizer.

Description
The dish is served in parts of Canada, where cattle ranching is prevalent and castration of young male animals is common. "Prairie oysters" is the preferred name in Canada where they are served in a demi-glace. In Oklahoma and the Texas Panhandle, they are often called calf fries. In Spain, Argentina and many parts of Mexico they are referred to as criadillas, and they are colloquially referred to as huevos de toro (literally, "bull’s eggs"; besides its literal meaning, huevos is a Spanish slang term for testicles) in Central and South America. Rocky Mountain oysters are sometimes confused because of their appearance with cattle fries or animelles (cattle testicles), which are served in a similar manner. A few other terms, such as "cowboy caviar", "Montana tendergroins", "dusted nuts", "swinging beef", or simply "mountain oysters" may be used.

The dish, purportedly cowboy fare, is most commonly found served at festivals, amongst ranching families, or at certain specialty eating establishments and bars. They are, however, also readily available at some public venues (e.g., at Coors Field during Colorado Rockies baseball games). Eagle, Idaho, claims to have the "World's Largest Rocky Mountain Oyster Feed" during its Eagle Fun Days (now held the second weekend in July). Clinton, Montana; Deerfield, Michigan; Huntley, Illinois; Sesser, Illinois; Olean, Missouri; Severance, Colorado; and Tiro, Ohio also hold testicle festivals. Rocky Mountain oysters are sometimes served as a prank to those unaware of the origin of these "oysters". They are also considered to be an aphrodisiac by many people.

The primary goal of testicle removal is not culinary. Castration in veterinary practice and animal husbandry is common and serves a variety of purposes, including the control of breeding, the growth of skeletal muscle suitable for beef, and temperament alteration.

Similar dishes

Testicles from other animals can also be used in similar dishes.  The most common is lamb fries (not to be confused with lamb's fry which is another term for liver of lamb) made with testicles from castrated sheep.  In some cases, pig testicles are used as well to make "pig fries".

Another dish found on occasion is turkey fries made from turkey testes.  These are sometimes known as "short fries" as well.

See also

 Fried clams
 Lamb fry
 List of beef dishes
 List of deep fried foods
 List of delicacies
 List of hors d'oeuvre
 Oyster omelette
 Soup Number Five

References

External links
 Earles, Jim. "Rocky Mountain Oysters: Expanding on the List of Organ Meats," The Weston A. Price Foundation.
 Brown, Patricia Leigh. "Delicacy of the Wild West Lives on for Those So Bold," The New York Times, Wednesday, March 18, 2009.
 Secret World - Montana: Rocky Mountain oysters 
 Lakey, Dwight, Songwriter. "Rocky Mountain Oysters," Songwriter Dwight Lakey's (ASCAP) song about Rocky Mountain oysters, © 2007 Brown Barn Publishing & Dwight Lakey, Danville, VT, & Julesburg, CO; All Rights Reserved.

Offal
Cuisine of the Western United States
Appetizers
Cowboy culture
Testicle
Texan cuisine
Oklahoma cuisine
Mexican cuisine
Central American cuisine
South American cuisine
Deep fried foods
Beef dishes
Canadian cuisine
Cuisine of the Southwestern United States
Cuisine of Western Canada